Kyrylo Olehovych Matvyeyev (born 22 June 1996) is a Ukrainian professional footballer who plays as a left winger for Lok Stendal.

Career
Matvyeyev is a product of the Shakhtar Donetsk academy.

He spent his career as a player for FC Metalurh Donetsk and FC Stal in the Ukrainian Premier League Reserves, but never made a debut in the Ukrainian Premier League. In July 2016 he signed a contract with the Ukrainian First League's team FC Arsenal Kyiv.

Personal life
Matvyeyev is a son of the retired Ukrainian professional footballer Oleh Matvyeyev.

References

External links
 
 
 

1996 births
Living people
Footballers from Donetsk
Ukrainian footballers
Association football forwards
FC Metalurh Donetsk players
FC Stal Kamianske players
FC Arsenal Kyiv players
FC Mariupol players
FC Yarud Mariupol players
1. FC Phönix Lübeck players
1. FC Lok Stendal players
Ukrainian First League players
Ukrainian Second League players
Oberliga (football) players
Ukrainian expatriate footballers
Expatriate footballers in Germany
Ukrainian expatriate sportspeople in Germany